Eurogate Rail Hungary, formerly Floyd Zrt, is a Hungarian private railway company founded in 2004 by Andras Bogdan. Its headquarters are in Budapest. Rolling stock is usually black with the name of the company written on a pink stripe. The vehicles were therefore given the nickname Pink Floyd.

The company mainly deals with the transit and transport of goods, with daily services to the Budapest Intermodal Logistics Center and Hamburg. In October 2008, Eurogate purchased a 51% shareholding and ICE Transport another 23%, with Andras Bogdan retaining 26%. In January 2022, Floyd Zrt was renamed Eurogate Rail Hungary.

Fleet details

Current 

 Siemens Vectron 193D – 6 units leased from BoxXpress.de
 Bombardier TRAXX F140 AC2 – 1 unit leased from Akiem
 LDE CFR 2100 - 429 series, three locomotives

Past 
 British Rail Class 86 - 450 series, nine locomotives
 450001 (ex 86248), 450002 (ex 86250), 450003 (ex 86232), 450004 (ex 86218), 450005 (ex 86215), 450006 (ex86217), 450007 (ex 86228), 450008 (ex 86242), 450 009 (ex 86424)
 British Rail Class 56 - 659 series, three locomotives
 659001 (ex 56101), 659002 (ex 56115), 659003 (ex 56117)
 60 CFR Series - 609 series, one locomotive
 CFR LDH 1250 - 429 series, one locomotive
 LDE CFR 1250 - 492 series, one locomotive

External links

More
 Floyd Co.

References

Railway companies established in 2004
Railway companies of Hungary
2004 establishments in Hungary